ACTE can mean: 
Alabama Council for Technology in Education
Association for Career and Technical Education
Association of Corporate Travel Executives 
Claudia Acte, a mistress of the emperor Nero
Agency for the Consolidation of Technology in Education
Acte or Akte, the ancient name of the peninsula now called Mount Athos
 ACTE Adaptive Compliant Trailing Edge - a form of morphing aircraft wing trailing edge designed improve fuel efficiency
 Acte, one of the Horae, goddesses of the hours of the day. She was the ninth hour of the day, of eating and pleasure, the second of the afternoon work hours.